Luca Brandolini, CM (born 25 December 1933) is an Italian prelate of the Roman Catholic Church who served as Bishop of Sora-Aquino-Pontecorvo from 1993 to 2009.

Biography
Luca Brandolini was born in Monte Compatri, and entered the Congregation of the Mission, more commonly known as the Lazarists, in October 1953. He made his profession as a Lazarist on 18 October 1955, and was ordained to the priesthood on 24 April 1960. During the Second Vatican Council (1962–1965), Brandolini was "a disciple" and "close co-worker" of Archbishop Annibale Bugnini, whose episcopal ring Brandolini now wears. In 1966, he obtained a bachelor's degree in theology with specialization in liturgy from the Pontifical Liturgical Institute of S. Anselmo. He did curial and pastoral work from 1971 to 1987, also teaching at the Pontifical Gregorian and Pontifical Lateran Universities.

On 29 October 1987, Brandolini was appointed Pro-Vicar General of Rome and Titular Bishop of Urusi by Pope John Paul II. He received his episcopal consecration on the following 7 December from Ugo Cardinal Poletti, with Archbishop Ennio Appignanesi and Bishop Plinio Pascoli serving as co-consecrators. Brandolini was later named President of the Italian Episcopal Conference's Commission for Liturgy in May 1993, and Bishop of Sora-Aquino-Pontecorvo on 2 September 1993.

He retired from this see in June 2009.

Brandolini disapproved of Pope Benedict XVI's Summorum Pontificum, saying to La Repubblica, "I can't fight back the tears. This is the saddest moment in my life as a man, priest and bishop...It's a day of mourning, not just for me but for the many people who worked for the Second Vatican Council. A reform for which many people worked, with great sacrifice and only inspired by the desire to renew the Church, has now been cancelled". However, he did declare, "I will obey the Holy Father, because I am a bishop and because I care for him".

He has also served as President of the Liturgical Action Centre.

References

External links

Catholic-Hierarchy
GCatholic.org
Diocese of Sora-Aquino-Pontecorvo
Letter of Cardinal Sodano to Bishop Brandolini

1933 births
Living people
People from Monte Compatri
Liturgists
Bishops in Lazio
20th-century Italian Roman Catholic bishops
21st-century Italian Roman Catholic bishops
People from Sora, Lazio